To "cut to the chase" is to get to the point without wasting time.

The saying originated from early film studios' silent films. It was a favorite of, and thought to have been coined by, Hal Roach Sr., it is however present in Chaucer's "The Wife of Bath's Tale"- "And shortly forth this tale for to chace" (to cut a long story short).

History 
Films, particularly comedies, often climaxed in chase scenes. Some inexperienced screenwriters or directors would pad the film with unnecessary dialogue, which bored the audience and prolonged the time before the exciting chase scene. Cut to the chase was a phrase used by movie studio executives to mean that the audience shouldn't get bored by the extra dialogue, and that the film should get to the interesting scenes without unnecessary delays. The phrase is now widely used, and means "get to the point."

An earlier version of the phrase (recorded 1880–1940) was Cut to Hecuba.  This refers to the practice of shortening matinée performances of Hamlet by cutting the long speeches before the reference to Hecuba in Act II, Scene ii.

References

External links 

 The Phrase Finder
 The Mavens' Word of the Day

English phrases
English-language idioms